SUNIST (or Sino-UNIted Spherical Tokamak) is a small spherical tokamak in the Department of Engineering Physics of Tsinghua University, Beijing, China.

The main parameters of SUNIST

Current research activities 
Alfven wave current drive experiments in spherical tokamak plasmas
Alfven wave can generate toroidal plasma current without density limits. This is very favourable for spherical tokamak plasmas, which have very high dielectric constants that makes LHCD or ECCD very hard.

References 

 A Research Program of Spherical Tokamak in China
 Initial Plasma Startup Test on SUNIST Spherical Tokamak 
 News about the construction of the SUNIST shperical tokamak (in Chinese)

Tokamaks
Tsinghua University
Nuclear technology in China